Barehta is a village in Garwara, Uttar Pradesh, India.

References

Villages in Banda district, India